
Sanhe may also refer to these places in China:

Sanhe, Hebei, a county-level city of Hebei

Subdistricts
 Sanhe Subdistrict, Fengdu County (三合街道), in Fengdu County, Chongqing
 Sanhe Subdistrict, Sandu County (三合街道), in Sandu Shui Autonomous County, Guizhou
 Sanhe Subdistrict, Chengdu (三河街道), in Xindu District, Chengdu, Sichuan

Towns
Sanhe, Feixi County (三河), in Feixi County, Anhui
Sanhe, Fuyang (三合), in Fuyang, Anhui
Sanhe, Huainan (三和), in Huainan, Anhui
Sanhe, Bishan District (三合), in Bishan District, Chongqing
Sanhe, Shizhu County (三河), in Shizhu Tujia Autonomous County, Chongqing
Sanhe, Hezheng County (三合), in Hezheng County, Gansu
Sanhe, Longnan (三河), in Longnan, Gansu
Sanhe, Dabu County (三河), in Dabu County, Guangdong
Sanhe, Taishan (三合), in Taishan, Guangdong
Sanhe, Guangxi (三合), in Pubei County, Guangxi
Sanhe, Bozhou District (三合), in Bozhou District, Zunyi, Guizhou
Sanhe, Renhuai (三合), in Renhuai, Zunyi, Guizhou
Sanhe, Heilongjiang (三河), in Suihua, Heilongjiang
Sanhe, Hubei (三合), in Yingcheng, Hubei
Sanhe, Jiangsu (三河), in Huai'an, Jiangsu
Sanhe, Longjing (三合), in Longjing, Jilin
Sanhe, Ningxia (三河), in Haiyuan County, Ningxia
Sanhe, Qinghai (三合), in Haidong, Qinghai
Sanhe, Shaanxi (三合), in Chenggu County, Shaanxi
Sanhe, Jiangyou (三合), in Jiangyou, Sichuan
Sanhe, Jianyang (三合), in Jianyang, Sichuan
Sanhe, Yilong County (三河), in Yilong County, Sichuan
Sanhe, Zhejiang (三合), in Tiantai County, Zhejiang
Sanhe, Yanling (三河), a town in Yanling County, Hunan, merged into Xiayang Town in 2015

Townships
 Sanhe Township, Gansu (三合乡), in Jingning County, Gansu
 Sanhe Hui Ethnic Township (三河回族乡), in Ergun, Inner Mongolia
 Sanhe Township, Baicheng (三合乡), in Baicheng, Jilin
 Sanhe Manchu and Korean Ethnic Township (三合满族朝鲜族乡), in Dongfeng County, Jilin
 Sanhe Township, Kangding (三合乡), in Kangding, Sichuan
 Sanhe Township, Tongjiang County (三合乡), in Tongjiang County, Sichuan
 Sanhe Township, Xuanhan County (三河乡), in Xuanhan County, Sichuan
 Heminghu, a town in Lindian County, Heilongjiang, known as Sanhe Township before 2015
 Niubeishan, a town in Yingjing County, Sichuan, known as Sanhe Township before 2017

Villages
Sanhe, in Sanhe, Hubei

Historical regions
Sanhe (三河), a collective term for Henan, Hedong and Henei regions in ancient China

See also
 Sanhe cattle, a Chinese breed of cattle produced by crossing European breeds with Mongolian ones
 Shanhe (disambiguation)